Sustut Provincial Park and Protected Area is a provincial park in British Columbia, Canada, located on the east side of the Sustut River and above the Bear River.  Established by order-in-council in 2001, the park has an area of 75,037 ha.  The park protects the Hogem Ranges and the Connelly Range and is in the traditional territories of the Tsay Keh Dene First Nation and the Gitxsan First Nation.

References

External links

Provincial parks of British Columbia
Omineca Country
Skeena Country
Protected areas established in 2001
2001 establishments in British Columbia